James Rutherford (1825 – 16 May 1883) was a 19th-century Member of Parliament in Otago, New Zealand.

He represented the Bruce electorate from 1881 to 1883, when he died.

References

1825 births
1883 deaths
Members of the New Zealand House of Representatives
New Zealand MPs for South Island electorates
19th-century New Zealand politicians